Luz Rosauro-Magsaysay (
Banzon; June 25, 1914 – August 17, 2004) was the wife of Philippine President Ramon Magsaysay and the seventh First Lady of the Philippines.

A native of Balanga, Magsaysay was devoted to her family, relatives and friends. She and Ramon had three children: Teresita (1934–1979), Milagros (b. 1936) and Ramon (b. 1938).

As the President's consort, Magsaysay was active in many socio-civic programs especially with the Philippine National Red Cross, of which she was honorary Chairwoman for several years. She is remembered as one of the most admired First Ladies and distinguished herself for her warmth and simplicity.

Magsaysay was widowed at 43 years old when President Magsaysay died in an aeroplane crash in 1957, three years and two months into his rule, making it was one of the shortest presidential terms in Philippine history. She dedicated herself to the preservation of her husband's memory and led a simple life that was true to her husband's legacy.

Death and legacy
She died on August 17, 2004, aged 90. In commemoration of her memory, a Barangay in Cebu City, near the Former Airport in Lahug (near the Present Waterfront Hotel and Casino), was named as Barangay Luz in the late 1960s and Barangay Luz Banzon in Jasaan, Misamis Oriental.

References

1914 births
2004 deaths
Filipino Roman Catholics
Luz
People from Balanga, Bataan
People from Zambales
 First Ladies and First Gentlemen of the Philippines
 Burials at the Manila North Cemetery
Spouses of presidents of the Philippines